Wang Jingping (Chinese: 王敬平; born 26 December 1992 in Dalian, Liaoning) is a Chinese football player who currently plays for China League Two side Dandong Tengyue.

Club career
In 2013, Wang Jingping started his professional footballer career with Dalian Aerbin in the Chinese Super League.  
On 28 February 2014, Wang transferred to Chinese Super League side Harbin Yiteng. He would eventually make his league debut for Harbin on 25 May 2014 in a game against Guangzhou R&F.

Career statistics 
Statistics accurate as of match played 31 December 2020.

References

External links
 

1992 births
Living people
Chinese footballers
Footballers from Dalian
Dalian Professional F.C. players
Zhejiang Yiteng F.C. players
Chinese Super League players
China League One players
Association football goalkeepers